Nachman, also Nahman is a Yiddish surname and given name, similar to the German surname Nachmann.
Notable people with the name include:

Surname
Dana Nachman, American documentary filmmaker
Gerald Nachman (born 1938), American journalist and writer
Jerry Nachman (1946–2004), American journalist
Jim Nachman, American politician
Rav Nachman (died 320), Jewish Talmudist
Ron Nachman (1942–2013), Israeli politician

Fictional characters
Raphael Nachman, fictional mathematician in the late stories of Leonard Michaels

Given name
Rebbe Nachman of Breslov
Rebbe Nachman of Horodenka
Nachman Aronszajn (1907–1980), Polish-American mathematician
Nachman Ben-Yehuda, Israeli sociologist
Nahman Berlin, German writer
Nachman Bulman (1925–2002), American rabbi
Nachman Chazan (1813–1884), Ukrainian Orthodox Jew
Nachman Dushanski (1919–2008), Lithuanian communist
Nachman Fahrner (born 1972), Israeli musician
Nachman Goldstein (died 1894), Ukrainian Orthodox rabbi
Nachman Shlomo Greenspan (1878–1961), Talmudic scholar
Nachman Kahana (born 1937), Israeli rabbi
Nachman Krochmal (1785–1840), Galician philosopher, theologian and historian
Nachman Shai (born 1946), Israeli journalist and politician
Nachman Syrkin (1868–1924), Belarusian Zionist and writer
Nachman Wolf, Israeli Paralympic athlete

See also

Jewish surnames
Yiddish-language surnames